the JaneDear girls was an American country music duo, consisting of Susie Brown (vocals, mandolin, fiddle, bass, guitar, accordion) from Alpine, Utah, and Danelle Leverett (vocals, guitar, banjo, harmonica) from Amarillo, Texas. The duo was with Warner Music Group Nashville's Reprise from 2010 to 2012. Their debut single, "Wildflower," was a Top 20 hit on the Hot Country Songs chart. After releasing only one album, the duo parted ways in mid-2012.

Biography
Danelle Leverett and Susie Brown met while at a songwriters' concert in Nashville, Tennessee. After being introduced to each other by songwriter Kris Bergsnes, they began writing songs together and later decided to form a duo, also by suggestion of Bergsnes.

They signed with Reprise Records' Nashville division. John Rich (of Big & Rich) signed on as their record producer, and began mentoring them as well. In mid-2010, Reprise released their debut single, "Wildflower." The song peaked at number 15 on the Hot Country Songs charts. Follow-up single "Shotgun Girl" stayed on the charts for 20 weeks, peaking at number 36 in July 2011. The album's third single, "Merry Go Round," was released on September 19, 2011, and peaked at number 44.

In early 2011, the duo received their first nominations at Academy of Country Music Awards including Top Vocal Duo and Top New Vocal Duo or Group. The awards were later awarded to Sugarland and The Band Perry, respectively. On January 31, 2012, they released a digital single, "Good Girls Gone Bad", featured on the soundtrack for the short-lived ABC drama GCB.

Brown and Leverett stopped recording together in mid-2012, with Brown announcing plans to record a solo album with producer James Stroud. Leverett co-wrote Big & Rich's 2012 single "That's Why I Pray", and began recording as Nelly Joy. In 2019, Joy joined the band Gone West.

Discography

Studio albums

Singles

Music videos

Awards and nominations

References

Country music groups from Tennessee
Country music duos
Musical groups from Nashville, Tennessee
Reprise Records artists
Musical groups established in 2004
Musical groups disestablished in 2012
2004 establishments in Tennessee
American musical duos
Female musical duos